Craig Weston (born 20 December 1973) is an Australian former professional rugby league footballer who played for the Gold Coast Seagulls, the Eastern Suburbs Roosters and the South Queensland Crushers. He then moved to England, where he played for the Huddersfield Giants, Doncaster and the Widnes Vikings.

Playing career
Amongst his best achievements in the New South Wales Rugby League was twice scoring 16 points in a game (on both occasions from two tries and four goals) whilst playing for the Gold Coast Seagulls.

After leaving the Seagulls for unsuccessful stints at the Eastern Suburbs Roosters and South Queensland Crushers, Weston moved to England to further his playing career in the late 1990s and later joined the Widnes Vikings in 2001, helping the team to win promotion to the Super League. He was released by the club before the start of the 2003 season so he could return home to Australia due to a family illness. He re-joined the club for one final season in 2004.

Statistics

References

External links

1973 births
Australian rugby league players
Doncaster R.L.F.C. players
Gold Coast Chargers players
Huddersfield Giants players
Leigh Leopards players
Living people
Rugby league centres
Rugby league five-eighths
Rugby league wingers
South Queensland Crushers players
Sydney Roosters players
Widnes Vikings players
Place of birth missing (living people)